Pyrausta pavidalis is a moth in the family Crambidae. It was described by Zerny in 1935. It is found in Turkey and Ukraine.

Subspecies
Pyrausta pavidalis pavidalis
Pyrausta pavidalis krimensis (Martin & Budashkin, 1992) (Ukraine: Crimea)

References

Moths described in 1935
pavidalis
Moths of Europe
Moths of Asia